"The Torment of a Flower", also known as "Rainy Night Flower", is a 1934 Taiwanese Hokkien song composed by Teng Yu-hsien and written by Chou Tien-wang.

About 
Taiwanese writer Liau Han-sin wrote the lyrics of a children's song "Spring" and gave it to Teng Yu-hsien, asking him to compose for it. This was the earliest version of "The Torment of a Flower".  Although Teng is a Hakka, he usually composed with Taiwanese Hokkien and not Hakka. Some scholars have questioned this story about children's songs.

In 1934, while Chou Tien-wang was working at record company Taiwan Columbia, he once went to a nightclub and heard a sad story about a girl who worked there.  Chou was touched, and he decided to rewrite the lyrics of "Spring", wrote the story into Teng's music, that is "The Torment of a Flower".  It is the first collaborative work between Teng and Chou.  Especially, there was usually three part lyrics in Taiwanese Hokkien songs then, but there are four parts in "The Torment of a Flower".

The first part of the lyrics means: "Blossom in a stormy night, pelted to the ground by the rain and wind. All by my lonesome, no one sees my constant grief for the blossom falling into the dirt that has no hope of revival."

During the Second World War, the Japanese Imperial Warlord tampered with the lyrics of the song to declare that the Taiwanese under their rule love Japan.  The Japanese version includes the line "How excited the honorable Japanese soldiers who wear red ribbons."

The song was played twice on a piano in the 2017 horror game Detention.

Lyrics

Notable performances 

 Placido Domingo sang this song with Jody Chiang in Taipei Concert Hall.
 The 2010 S.H.E song  is a partial cover of "The Torment of a Flower".
 Hayley Westenra performed the song at a 2010 concert in Kaohsiung.
 , a 2011 television drama series produced by Sanlih Television, was inspired by the song.

References 

Taiwanese songs
1934 songs
Southern Min-language songs
Songs with music by Teng Yu-hsien
+